A qashabiya is a traditional berber Algerian garment most often associated with the Chaoui, and those from Djelfa.  It is made of camel hair and wool, and is held in high esteem by many Algerians because of the warmth it provides during cold winters, especially in the high plateaus of the Chaouia region where it is produced.

See also 
 Burnous
 Algerian Kaftan
 Chedda of Tlemcen

References

Algerian clothing
Dresses